Diepkloof is a large zone of Soweto township in the Gauteng province of South Africa. It is also sometimes referred to as Diepmeadow, if considered as a single township with the nearby Meadowlands (although there is Orlando in between). Diepkloof was established in 1959 to accommodate people being removed from Alexandra.

References

Johannesburg Region D
Townships in Gauteng
Soweto Townships